is a district of Minato, Tokyo, Japan. It consists of 1 to 4-chōme. Azabu-Jūban Station is located in this district.

Azabu-Juban is a residential area in central Tokyo with a mixture of Japanese shops, restaurants and bars. The convenience of several supermarkets in a central location and the proximity of Hiroo and Roppongi make it one of the most trendy and sought after residential areas of Tokyo. The main street, a block away from a busy road junction, has a village-like feel with cobbled stoned paving in some places. This atmosphere is created by the narrow streets, slow moving traffic, and a mixture of stores operated by older owners. Even the McDonald's has been carefully designed to be architecturally sympathetic.

Azabu-Juban is known for being the main setting of the famous magical girls manga/anime series, Sailor Moon.

Azabu-Juban matsuri
In the middle of August (usually at the beginning or end of the Japanese Obon holiday), Azabu-Juban holds one of the most famous local summer festivals (matsuri) in Tokyo;
The event takes place over two days on Saturday and Sunday with the streets being lined with local stalls and food vendors.
Traffic is typically blocked from 3:00 to 9:00 pm on both days.
During this time, large crowds of festival goers make the main streets largely impassable.

In 2011, this festival was cancelled, due to the practice of  - voluntary self-restraint - implemented after the 2011 Tōhoku earthquake.

Azabu-Juban hot spring
Until 2008, Azabu-juban had one of several natural onsen(:ja:麻布十番温泉) in Tokyo.
Every Sunday from 3:00 pm visitors could enjoy traditional Japanese songs (enka) and dancing.
The site of the hot spring has since become a car park.

Education
Minato City Board of Education operates public elementary and junior high schools. Azabu-Jūban 1-chōme, and 1-8 ban of 2-chōme, are zoned to Nanzan Elementary School (南山小学校). 9-21 ban of Azabu-Jūban 2-chōme and Azabu-Jūban 3-4-chōme are zoned to Higashimachi Elementary School (東町小学校). All of Azabu-Jūban is zoned to Roppongi Junior High School (六本木中学校).

In fiction
The protagonists of the manga and anime series Sailor Moon reside in this district.

References

Districts of Minato, Tokyo